Punch-Out may refer to:

Video games

 Punch-Out!!, a series of boxing video games made by Nintendo
 Punch-Out!! (arcade game), a 1984 arcade game
 Punch-Out!! (NES), a 1987 video game for the NES originally known as Mike Tyson's Punch-Out!!
 Punch-Out!! (Wii), a 2009 video game for the Wii
 Super Punch-Out!! (arcade game), a 1985 arcade game
 Super Punch-Out!!, a 1994 video game for the Super NES

Other

 Punch-out (baseball), another name for a strike out, mainly if the third strike is a called third strike
 "Punch Out" (Ugly Betty), the nineteenth episode from the dramedy series Ugly Betty
 Punch in/out, in multitrack recording and production
 Punchout (comics), a mutant in the Marvel Comics universe
 A slang term for ejection
 Procurement PunchOut, a concept in cXML online sales
 Punch out book, a large toy book printed on stiff card or cardboard usually comprising several pages of perforated, colorfully printed figures or shapes

See also
 Knockout
 Punch (disambiguation)
 Out (disambiguation)